Magnuson Hotels (also Magnuson Worldwide) is a hotel conversion brand in the US, UK and Europe with over 1,000 hotels across six countries and four continents.

Founded in 2003 by Thomas and Melissa Magnuson, Magnuson Hotels made its mark as ‘the low-cost alternative to franchising’ by providing independent hotels access to chain-level distribution and resources. In 2006, Magnuson Hotels introduced three hotel brands serving the upper midscale, midscale and economy segments; ultimately the largest customer segments globally.

References

External links
Magnuson Worldwide

Companies based in Spokane, Washington
Hotels established in 2003
Hotel chains